Trypes ston paradeiso ('Holes in Paradise') is the third album of the band Trypes. It was recorded during November and December 1989 and April 1990 and released in 1990 on LP and MC. It was re-released on CD in 1991. The album comprises 13 tracks.

Δώσ' μου λίγη ακόμα αγάπη (Give me some more love)
Αυτό που οι σκύλοι βάφτισαν αγάπη (The thing the dogs named love)
Γίνομαι άντρας (I am becoming a man)
Όλα τελικά ξαναγυρνάν σε μας (It all eventually comes back to us)
Υπάρχει η αγάπη (There is love)
Στην τροχιά των χαμένων (In the orbit of the losers)
Εδώ (Here)
Στον παράδεισο (In paradise)
Πώς; (How?)
Κράτα το σώου μαϊμού (Keep the show going monkey)
Τα κανονικά παιδιά (The normal children)
Οι δράκοι της γης (The dragons of the earth)

References

Trypes albums
1990 albums